Juan Natalicio González Paredes (8 September 1897 – 6 December 1966) was a Paraguayan poet who served as President of Paraguay from 15 August 1948 to 30 January 1949.

Early life 

Natalicio González was born in Villarrica in the department of Guairá. Having lost his parents, he moved to Asunción, Paraguay's capital, in 1912 to finish his high school studies. He graduated in 1915 from the Colegio Nacional de Asunción (Asunción's National College), and planned to study medicine in the Universidad Nacional de Asunción (Asunción's National University). However, that same year the government shut down the UNA's medical school. Meanwhile, Natalicio started developing a career as journalist and writer, and became affiliated with the Colorado Party. He had no further formal education, but he achieved an outstanding intellectual level through a very disciplined self-education.

In 1928 he married Lydia Frutos, a well-known Paraguayan socialite. Lydia was famous for her beauty and also for her high intellectual level, having graduated from educational institutions abroad.

Politician and writer 
Natalicio was associated with some of the intellectuals of the Colorado Party. His links with people like Juan O'Leary, Fulgencio R. Moreno and Antolín Irala—among others—made possible for him to achieve prominence in the party's organization and propaganda machinery. Very soon he became the main writer for some newspapers linked to the Colorado Party, like Patria, Colorado, and El País. During this time he published some books of poetry, political commentary, and historical essays.

In 1920 he moved to Buenos Aires, Argentina, where he worked for a major publishing company. His duties allowed him to travel all over South America and meet politicians, writers, and intellectuals from different South American countries.

In 1923 he moved to Paris, to work with a Paraguayan publishing company. He spent two years in Europe, returning to Paraguay at the end of 1924.

After he returned to Asunción, he became more active in the Colorado Party. He reached higher positions in the Party's organization and, by 1926, he was one of the leading party members who negotiatiated for a new electoral law with the ruling Liberals.

Unfortunately for the Colorados, the negotiations with the Liberal government became a source of  division within the Colorado Party. The abstencionistas were reluctant to negotiate anything with the government; they supported abstention from voting to channel popular discontent against the government and bring about a  non-violent revolution. The eleccionistas responded positively to the government's calls for a political ceasefire. Natalicio was one of the main and most dynamic leader of the eleccionistas.

Finally, by 1927, the new electoral law passed and was applied for the first time in the legislative elections held in the beginning of that year. The eleccionista Colorado Party won some seats in the Chamber of Deputies and the Senate, forming a minority bloc. The Colorado senators were mostly former ministers and intellectual leaders during past Colorado governments, while  the Deputies included new younger figures, mostly teachers and journalists, who were developing new political idea. Natalicio was the leader of this group, and acted as minority leader during his tenure as Deputy.

However, by 1929, Natalicio was not satisfied with the way Paraguayan politics were going. He did not expect the Colorados to get anything at all from participating in electoral politics and the legislature while the Liberals were in power.

In 1929 Natalicio asked the Chamber of Deputies for permission to leave his post and travel to Europe with his wife.

He was Minister of Finance of Paraguay from 1946 to 1948.

Presidency  
Natalicio was elected President on 14 February 1948; he was nominated by the Colorados, and was the only candidate. Incumbent President Higinio Morínigo, who had been a de facto dictator, threatened a coup d´état to retain power. and was himself deposed by a coup on 3 June. Juan Manuel Frutos became interim president until  Natalicio took office on 15 August.

One of the most important acts of his administration was the nationalization of the American Light and Traction Company (CALT), which later became the Ande. One of his famous phrases was: "There will be no red poor"; this led him to give important and politically powerful positions to
representatives of all sections of the Colorado Party.

From the start of his term, there were rumors that he would not finish his term of office. On 26 October 1948 dissident Colorados attempted a coup d'état against him. The rebellion was blocked by loyalist forces, but Natalicio could not hold out for long. On 29 January 1949 another coup broke out, initiated by Felipe Molas López, Federico Chaves, and defense minister General Raimundo Rolón, who controlled the military forces. Natalicio resigned in the early morning of 30 January, and General Rolón took power.

Natalicio González was again driven into exile. On 7 February 1949 he went to Buenos Aires. In 1950 he went to Mexico. He was the last intellectual to hold the presidency of the Republic in the twentieth century.

Death 
Natalicio died in Mexico on 6 December 1966, of a heart attack. He had been invited back to Paraguay and was to leave that very day. His wife Lydia committed suicide after finding his body. (She swallowed painkillers and cut her wrists.)

References

 Publications at the newspaper ABC Color.

1897 births
1966 deaths
People from Villarrica, Paraguay
Paraguayan people of Spanish descent
Paraguayan writers
Paraguayan historians
Paraguayan geographers
Paraguayan sociologists
Colorado Party (Paraguay) politicians
Presidents of Paraguay
Finance Ministers of Paraguay
Paraguayan expatriates in Mexico
Paraguayan expatriates in Argentina
20th-century historians
20th-century geographers